= Enterprise Magazine (Canada) =

Defunct Canadian business magazine

Enterprise Magazine, launched in 1998, was a Canadian bimonthly business magazine that was in circulation between 1998 and April 2020.

== History and profile ==
It was launched in 1998 as Small Business Canada Magazine. The name change to Enterprise was made in January 2005 as its readership grew to include small and medium-sized enterprises (SMEs) across Canada.

Based in Barrie, Ontario, Enterprise was published four times a year. Its frequency switched to bimonthly later. It was first owned by Typgrafika Inc of Barrie, Ontario. The publisher was Hayden R. Bradshaw. As of 2015 it was published by Central 1. The magazine ceased publication after the March/April 2020 issue due to low readership.
